Main-Tauber-Kreis is a Landkreis (district) in the northeast of Baden-Württemberg, Germany. Neighboring districts are (from northwest clockwise) Miltenberg, Main-Spessart, Würzburg, Neustadt (Aisch)-Bad Windsheim and Ansbach (all in Bavaria), and the districts of Schwäbisch Hall, Hohenlohe and Neckar-Odenwald.

History 
The district originated in 1973 with the merging of the districts of Bad Mergentheim, Tauberbischofsheim and parts of the district of Buchen. At first called the district of Tauber, it took its current name, the district of Main-Tauber, in 1974. The name comes from the two primary rivers in the district, the Main and the Tauber.

Geography 

The Main forms the northern border of the district, while its affluent Tauber flows through the district from southeast to north. The north of the district covers part of the Odenwald mountains, while the southern area is called Bauland.

Coat of arms 
The coat of arms show the symbols of the three historical states to which the area of the district belonged. The biggest part of the district was part of the Bishopric of Würzburg until 1803; Würzburg is represented by the red and white field divided by a line with three peaks, which was originally the coat of arms of Franconia. The wheel is the symbol of the Archbishopric of Mainz; the cross is the symbol of the Teutonic Order.

Cities and municipalities

References

External links 

 Official website (German)

 
Stuttgart (region)
Districts of Baden-Württemberg